PHotoEspaña, the International Festival of Photography and Visual Arts of Madrid, is a photography forum that began in 1998. The Festival’s program presents work by Spanish and international image-makers. It runs an awards programme with several categories.

Details
Over 600 exhibitions have been presented in museums, art centres and galleries, which have attracted more than half a million visitors each year, making PHotoEspaña the largest cultural event in Spain.

Each edition of PHotoEspaña is dedicated to a specific theme and the programme is divided into: the Official Section, which includes museums, institutions and large exhibition centres; and the Festival Off, which includes art galleries and other venues.

Some of the institutions that have taken part in hosting the festival include: Casa de América, Museo Nacional Centro de Arte Reina Sofía, Museo Thyssen-Bornemisza, Círculo de Bellas Artes, Centro Cultural Conde Duque, Fundación Telefónica, Fundación Canal, Centro Cultural de la Villa, Real Jardín Botánico and the Prado Museum, among others.

The Festival is supported by private companies and public institutions such as the Ministry of Culture and the Regional and Municipal Governments of Madrid. It is organized by La Fábrica, a cultural management entity.

Francis Hodgson, writing in the Financial Times in 2014, said "PHotoEspaña gives every photography festival in the world a standard to aim for."

Awards

Discovery Award
The PhotoEspaña Discovery Award for best portfolio (Premio PHotoEspaña Descubrimientos al mejor portfolio) is an award that has been given since 1998. It is open to any photographer who has attended one of PhotoEspaña's portfolio reviews, which are held in Madrid, Caracas and São Paulo. The winner receives an exhibition in the next edition of Photoespaña.
2007: Battered by Harri Pälviranta.
2014: Moises by Mariela Sancari. The judges were Greg Hobson, Raphaelle Stopin and Christin Ann Bertrand.
2015: Parallel Crisis by Yannis Karpouzis. The judges were Lorenza Bravetta, Gilles Favier and Markus Hartmann.
2019: Investigation of Love by Lilia Luganskaia

Best Photography Book, international category

2010: Atlas Monographs by Max Pam. Sydney: T&G Publishing, 2009. With the writer Stephen Muecke.
2014: Party. Quotations from Chairman Mao Tse-Tung by Cristina de Middel. Madrid: RM; London: Archive of Modern Conflict, 2013. .
2017: (Un)expected by Peter Dekens. Breda, the Netherlands: The Eriskay Connection, 2016.
2018: The Restoration Will by Mayumi Suzuki. Siena, Italy: Ceiba Editions, 2017.
2019: Gülistan by Lukas Birk and Natasha Christia. Austria: Fraglich, 2019.
2021: Hayal & Hakikat: A Handbook of Forgiveness & A Handbook of Punishment by Cemre Yeşil Gönenli

Best Photography Book, national category

2014:
Winner: Ostalgia by Simona Rota. Cádiz, Spain: Cuadernos de la Kursala, University of Cádiz, 2013. Edited by Fabulatorio.
Honourable mention: The Pigs by Carlos Spottorno. Madrid: RM / Phree, 2013.
2018: Like by Eduardo Nave. Barcelona, Spain: Ediciones Anómalas, 2018.
2019: Remembering the Future by Ángel Albarrán & Anna Cabrera. Madrid: RM / Phree, 2019.
2021: Where the maps bend by Juan Valbuena

Best Self-Published Book 

 2019: The Migrant by Anäis López
 2021: SPIN by Yusuke Takagi

Outstanding Publishing House of the Year
2014: Dewi Lewis
2018: Skinnerboox
2019: Phree

PhotoEspaña and OjodePez Award for Human Values

2014: Aitor Lara

PhotoEspaña Award
This award pays tribute to the professional career of a major figure.

2014: 
2019: Donna Ferrato
2021: Isabel Muñoz

Bartolomé Ros Award
Awarded for the best Spanish career in photography.

2014: 
2019: Pilar Pequeño

References

External links
 
PHotoEspaña 2013: Interview Claude Bussac, the director of the Festival PHotoEspaña since 2007 Le Journal de la Photographie

Photography festivals
Photography in Spain
Art festivals in Spain
Festivals in Madrid
Photography awards